Alfred Ernest Cooke (c.1870 – 3 June 1900) was a New Zealand rugby union player who represented the All Blacks in 1894. His position of choice was halfback. Cooke did not play in any test matches as New Zealand did not play their first until 1903.

Career 
Out of the Merivale club, Cooke was described as "a fine halfback, exceptionally quick at getting the ball away from the scrum and also a powerful and accurate line kicker".

Cooke had a short career, playing just three seasons for the Canterbury province.

Cooke played for Canterbury in their game against the touring New South Wales side, which was won 11-3.  Based on this performance Cooke was selected for the All Blacks side to play the tourists in the unofficial "test" match just two days later. The match was lost 8-6.

This was his only appearance for the national side.

Personal and death 
Cooke was an auctioneer by occupation.

His younger brother, Reuben, was an All Black in 1903.

Unfortunately, Cooke died in 1900, three years before his brother would make his All Black debut. He was shot accidentally by a friend whilst being part of a shooting expedition at Lake Ellesmere / Te Waihora.

References 

1870s births
1900 deaths
New Zealand rugby union players
New Zealand international rugby union players
Rugby union players from Christchurch
Hunting accident deaths
Firearm accident victims
Deaths by firearm in New Zealand
Accidental deaths in New Zealand